The Red Flag Tour was the second headlining concert tour by British girl group All Saints. Supporting their fourth studio album Red Flag (2016), the tour ran from 6 October 2016 to 18 October 2016. It marked the group's first headlining tour in 15 years and was preceded by a headlining show at London's KOKO on 4 April 2016.

Background and announcement

After splitting in 2009, All Saints were unexpectedly invited to perform as special guests for five dates of the Backstreet Boys' In a World Like This Tour in Ireland and the UK. Their tour dates ran from 26 March to 5 April 2014. Although All Saints made no money from the tour and funded their sets themselves, they saw it as an opportunity to do what they enjoyed the most and did the least, describing the experience as "refreshing" and "money well spent". It ultimately sparked interest within the group to pursue a new studio album and full-scale comeback; group member Natalie Appleton explained: "We thought we'd just do it for a laugh, but then we just didn't want it to end. We liked being together. We wanted to be together. I mean we hang out anyway, but we wanted to be together in this world."

On 22 February 2016, All Saints announced their first headlining show in over a decade at London's KOKO. Tickets for the show on 4 April 2016 sold out in a minute. On 15 March 2016, the group announced their first headlining tour in 15 years in support of their 2016 comeback album, Red Flag. Tickets for the tour were first made available on 16 March 2016 through an exclusive fan pre-sale on the group's website for its newsletter subscribers, and then later through Gigsandtours.com on 18 March 2016 at 09:00 BST. The Red Flag Tour will visit 10 British cities throughout October 2016, beginning in Newcastle upon Tyne and ending in Norwich. The group revealed that the tour set list will comprise all of their successful singles as well as some tracks from Red Flag.

Setlist
 "Intro"
 "I Know Where It's At"
 "Puppet on a String"
 "Rock Steady"
 "Black Coffee"
 "Summer Rain"
 "Chick Fit"
 "Ratchet Behaviour"
 "Red Flag"
 "Lady Marmalade"
 "This Is a War"
 "War of Nerves"
 "One Woman Man"
 "Bootie Call"
 "Who Hurt Who"
 "Twentyfourseven
 "Never Felt Like This Before" 
 "Don't Worry"
 "Under the Bridge"
 "Never Ever"
 "One Strike"
 "Pure Shores"

Shows

References

External links
Official website

2016 concert tours
All Saints (group)